Julian Dudda (born 8 April 1993) is a German footballer who plays as a centre-back for Hessenliga side Türk Gücü Friedberg.

Club career
Dudda played for youth teams such as JSG Wöllstadt, JSG Echzell, TSG Wölfersheim and FSV Frankfurt.

He joined Eintracht Frankfurt in summer 2007 aged 14. In the 2009–10 season, he won the Under 17 Bundesliga championship with Eintracht Frankfurt. In the 2010–11 season, he changed to Frankfurt's under-19 team, who plays in the Under 19 Bundesliga South/Southwest.

Dudda made his Bundesliga debut on 7 May 2011 in a 2–0 loss to 1. FC Köln. At that time, he was the seventh youngest Bundesliga player ever. On 12 May 2011, he signed a professional contract with Eintracht Frankfurt.

International career
Dudda made his debut for the German under-18 team on 10 October 2010 in a 1–0 victory against Ukraine. On 24 March 2011, in his second game for the Germans, he came as substitute in the 46th minute for Antonio Rüdiger.

References

External links
 
 

1993 births
People from Bad Nauheim
Sportspeople from Darmstadt (region)
Footballers from Hesse
Living people
German footballers
Association football defenders
Germany youth international footballers
Eintracht Frankfurt players
SV Werder Bremen II players
Kickers Offenbach players
Sportfreunde Siegen players
SC Hessen Dreieich players
Bundesliga players
Regionalliga players
Hessenliga players